The Karok hesperion also known as the Karok Indian snail, scientific name Vespericola karokorum, is a species of air-breathing land snail, a terrestrial pulmonate gastropod mollusk in the family Polygyridae. This species is endemic to the United States.

References

Polygyridae
Gastropods described in 1962
Endemic fauna of the United States
Taxonomy articles created by Polbot